Sir Thomas Shirley (1564 – c. 1634) was an English soldier, adventurer and politician who sat in the House of Commons at various times between 1584 and 1622. His financial difficulties drove him into privateering which culminated in his capture by the Turks and later imprisonment in the Tower of London.

Family
Thomas Shirley was the eldest son of Sir Thomas Shirley of Wiston House, Sussex, and Anne Kempe, the daughter of Sir Thomas Kempe (d. 7 March 1591) of Olantigh in Wye, Kent. Sir Anthony Shirley and Sir Robert Shirley were his younger brothers.

Career

Shirley matriculated at Hart Hall, Oxford in 1579, but left the university without taking a degree. In 1584 he was elected Member of Parliament for Steyning. He went on military service with his father and brother in the Low Countries in 1585, and later saw some in Ireland. He was knighted at Kilkenny in Ireland by the lord deputy, Sir William Fitz-William, on 26 October 1589. Shirley later came to the court. In the summer of 1591 he made a secret marriage to one of Queen Elizabeth's maids of honour and when the queen heard of it, she promptly committed him to the Marshalsea Prison. He remained in prison till the spring of 1592. In 1593 he was elected MP for Steyning again. In the same year he saw service with the rank of captain in the Low Countries again.

Shirley was beginning to suffer from hopeless embarrassment because of his father's increasing financial difficulties. To secure a livelihood, he decided to fit out a privateering expedition to attack Spanish merchandise. He handed over his company at Flushing to Sir Thomas Vavasour, a relation of his wife, and in the summer of 1598 sailed into the English Channel, and seized four 'hulks' of Lübeck which were reputed to be carrying Spanish goods. He may have made some of his attacks with the Queen's ship Foresight, which he commanded in 1599. The costs and returns were high. A ship that Shirley captured while returning from San Domingo laden with sugar, was valued at £4,700. In April 1600, Shirley offered the Earl of Nottingham £600 for his tenth share in two ships which he brought into Plymouth and said he had already paid £2,000 for 'the company's thirds'. In October 1600 Shirley was brought before the Admiralty court for seizing a ship from Hamburg which had a cargo belonging to some Dutch merchants and Lord Cobham had to intervene on his behalf. He was also coming under attack from his creditors for in July 1600 some supporters of Sir Richard Weston broke into his father's house at Blackfriars and threatened the Shirleys, father and son, demanding payment. In 1601 his father required the borough seat of Steyning. Shirley was elected MP for both Bramber and Hastings and chose to sit for Hastings. In 1602 he renewed his privateering adventures, and pillaged 'two poor hamlets of two dozen houses in Portugal.'

At the end of 1602 Shirley equipped two ships for a more ambitious adventure in the Levant where he aimed to strike a blow against the Ottoman Empire of Mehmed III. He was given encouragement by the Duke of Tuscany at Florence, who supported Rudolf II, Holy Roman Emperor in this respect. However, he made an imprudent descent on the island of Kea on 15 Jan 1603 and was captured by the Turks. He was transferred to Negropont on 20 March, and on 25 July 1603 he was carried a close prisoner to Constantinople. When news of his misfortunes reached England, James I appealed to the government of the sultan to release him. The English ambassador to the Porte, Henry Lello, used every effort on his behalf, and finally he was released on 6 December 1605, after eleven hundred dollars had been paid to his gaolers. He immediately went to Naples, where he was described by Toby Mathew, on 8 August 1606, as living there 'like a gallant.' At the end of 1606 he returned to England.

Shirley was imprisoned in the Tower of London in September 1607 on a charge of illegal interference with the operations of the Levant Company. It was said that he had "overbusied himself with the traffic of Constantinople, to have brought it to Venice and to the Florentine territories." In August 1611 he was confined in the king's bench as an insolvent debtor. The death of his father next year, and his second marriage greatly increased his difficulties. Wiston, which had fallen into ruins, was sold, but he was elected MP for Steyning in 1614, and 1621.

Shirley is said to have retired subsequently to the Isle of Wight, and to have died there about 1630.

Marriages and issue
Shirley married firstly Frances Vavasour, daughter of Henry Vavasour of Copmanthorpe, by whom he had three sons and four daughters. His second son, Henry Shirley, was the dramatist who was murdered in London on 31 October 1627. His only surviving son by his first marriage, Thomas Shirley, was baptised at West Clandon, Surrey, on 30 June 1597, was knighted in 1645 by Charles I at Oxford, was alive in 1664, and was father of Thomas Sherley [q. v.], the physician.

Shirley married secondly at Deptford on 2 December 1617, a widow, Judith Taylor, daughter of William Bennet of London, by whom he had five sons and six daughters.

See also
García de Silva Figueroa

Notes

References

Attribution
 

 

1564 births
1630s deaths
People of Elizabethan Ireland
Alumni of Hart Hall, Oxford
Levant Company
English privateers
English soldiers
Prisoners in the Tower of London
English MPs 1584–1585
English MPs 1593
English MPs 1601
English MPs 1614
English MPs 1621–1622
People from Wiston, West Sussex